Vesyoly is a rural locality (a khutor) in Abadzekhskoye Rural Settlement of Maykopsky District, Russia. The population was 303 as of 2018.

References 

Rural localities in Maykopsky District